Monkeys for Nothin' and the Chimps for Free is the sixth studio album from Reel Big Fish, This is their first studio album after being dropped by Jive Records and their final album with bassist Matt Wong.

The CD is accompanied with a 22-minute DVD of the "Making of Monkeys for Nothin' and the Chimps for Free". According to the documentary, this album was originally proposed as a fourth disc to the band's live album, but the band had decided they had enough live material and so decided to do this album as a compilation of B-sides and re-recordings alongside some new songs.  This documentary also contains footage of the band mixing a song which does not appear on the final album, about 20 minutes into the video. The song would later be released (without vocals) as a bonus track for A Best of Us for the Rest of Us.

The title is a pun on the line "Money for nothin' and your chicks for free" from the Dire Straits song "Money for Nothing."

Release
In March and April 2007, Reel Big Fish went on a tour of Australia. On May 4, 2007, Monkeys for Nothin' and the Chimps for Free was announced for released in two months' time. Thirteen days later, "I'm Her Man" was posted on the band's Myspace profile. They then toured Europe until June, which included appearances at the Download and Slam Dunk Festivals. "Party Down" was released to radio on June 26; two days later, bassist Matt Wong left the band to focus on family, and was replaced by Derek Gibbs. Monkeys for Nothin' and the Chimps for Free was released through Rock Ridge Music on July 10, 2007. Three days later, a music video was released for "Party Down", directed by Tyler Trautman.

In July and August 2007, the band went on a co-headlining US tour with Less Than Jake, with support from Streetlight Manifesto and Against All Authority. In December 2007, they supported Less Than Jake on their headlining tour of Australia. Coinciding with this trek, Monkeys for Nothin' and the Chimps for Free was released on vinyl. Between January and March 2008, the band embarked on a European tour with Streetlight Manifesto. In April 2008, the band appeared at the Bamboozle Left festival. Between June and August 2008, the band performed on the Warped Tour.

Track listing

On the back cover of the album, tracks 1 through 10 are credited as "Monkeys" while tracks 11 through 17 are credited as "Chimps." The Chimps section of the album consists of re-recordings.

The band's MySpace page indicates that 19 songs were recorded during the sessions, leaving 2 songs that will not appear on the store-bought album. One of these, "Bang! The Mouse Explodes," is available on the iTunes and vinyl releases of the album. Portions of the 19th track can be heard on the DVD packaged with the CD. This 19th song would eventually be stripped of its vocals and released as a digital bonus track with A Best of Us for the Rest of Us.

Personnel
Reel Big Fish
 Aaron Barrett - lead guitar, lead vocals
 John Christianson - Trumpet
 Scott Klopfenstein - Trumpet, vocals, keyboards, additional guitar on "Party Down"
 Dan Regan - Trombone
 Ryland Steen - drums
 Matt Wong - Bass guitar

Additional musicians
 Molly Barrett - Southern belle on "I'm Her Man"
 David Irish - Group vocals, additional cursing on "Another F.U. Song"
 Brian Klemm - Guitar solo fighter on "I'm Her Man" and additional cursing on "Another F.U. Song"
 Jon Kubis - Accordion on "Please Don't Tell Her I Have a Girlfriend"
 Kiersten Stevens - Rape Whistle on "Everybody's Drunk"

References

External links

Monkeys for Nothin' and the Chimps for Free at YouTube (streamed copy where licensed)

2007 albums
Reel Big Fish albums
Rock Ridge Music albums